Balaş Fitzi (2 January 1941 – 2001) was a Romanian weightlifter. He competed at the 1960 Summer Olympics and the 1964 Summer Olympics.

References

External links
 

1941 births
2001 deaths
Romanian male weightlifters
Olympic weightlifters of Romania
Weightlifters at the 1960 Summer Olympics
Weightlifters at the 1964 Summer Olympics
Sportspeople from Cluj-Napoca
20th-century Romanian people
21st-century Romanian people